Foster Dwight Coburn (May 7, 1846 – May 11, 1924) was an American farmer and statesman.  He served as secretary of the Kansas Department of Agriculture.

Early years
Coburn was born in Jefferson County, Wisconsin in 1846, a son of Ephraim W. and Mary Jane (Mulks) Coburn. He was reared on a farm until the age of 13 years. He received his elementary education in the country schools. He served during the latter years of the American Civil War in two Illinois regiments—first as corporal in Company F, One Hundred and Thirty-fifth infantry, and subsequently as private and sergeant-major of the Sixty-second veteran infantry.on his own account.

Career
In 1867, he came to Franklin County, Kansas where he worked as a farm laborer, taught school, and later became a farmer and breeder of improved live stock. He was editor of the Live Stock Indicator, published at Kansas City, Missouri, and was president of the Indicator Publishing Company. Coburn was the sole judge of swine at the 1884 World Cotton Centennial; was one of the judges of swine at the 1893 World's Columbian Exposition; and was chief of the department of live stock at the 1904 Louisiana Purchase Exposition. He was unanimously elected president of the first national corn congress at Chicago in 1898; and served several terms as president and vice-president of the board of regents of the Kansas State Agricultural College. He was a director and vice-president of the Prudential Trust Company; a director of the Prudential State Bank; and vice-president and a director of the Capitol Building and Loan Association, all of Topeka. He was an honorary life member of the Kansas State Horticultural Society, and an honorary member of the Kansas State Editorial Association, and was a director of the Kansas State Historical Society. In June, 1909, he was honored with the degree of A. M. from Baker University, and the following November he received the degree of LL. D. from the Kansas State Agricultural College.

Personal life
In 1869, Coburn married Miss Lou Jenkins, and they had two daughters, and a son, Clay. Coburn died in 1924 and is buried at Topeka Cemetery in Topeka, Kansas.

Partial works

 Kansas and her resources (1902)
 Alfalfa, lucerne, Spanish trefoil, Chilian clover, Brazilian clover, French clover, medic, purple medic: practical information on its production, qualities, worth and uses, especially in the United States and Canada (1907)
 Swine in America (1916)
 Swine Husbandry (1919)
 The Book of Alfalfa
 The Helpful Hen
 Corn and Sorghums
 Railroads and Agriculture
 Pork Production
 Wheat Growing
 Forage and Fodders
 The Horse Useful
 Modern Dairying
 Profitable Poultry
 The Modern Sheep

References

External links

1846 births
1924 deaths
People from Jefferson County, Wisconsin
People of Illinois in the American Civil War
Kansas Secretaries of Agriculture
Farmers from Kansas
American editors
Kansas State University people
People buried in Topeka Cemetery